Mark Twain Hotel is a historic hotel building located at Hannibal, Marion County, Missouri.  It was designed by Barnett, Haynes & Barnett and built in 1905. It is a four-story, Renaissance Revival style steel-frame structure with a granite foundation and beige pressed-brick exterior. The annex was built in 1918. It features semicircular arches over the main door and adjacent windows.

It was then added to the National Register of Historic Places in 1986.

References

Hotel buildings on the National Register of Historic Places in Missouri
Renaissance Revival architecture in Missouri
Hotel buildings completed in 1905
Buildings and structures in Hannibal, Missouri
National Register of Historic Places in Marion County, Missouri
1905 establishments in Missouri